The United States Junior Amateur Championship is one of the fourteen U.S. national golf championships organized by the United States Golf Association. It is open to amateur boys who are under 19 on the last day of the competition and have a USGA Handicap Index of 4.4 or less. The competition was established in 1948. It consists of two days of stroke play, with the leading 64 competitors then playing a match play competition to decide the champion.

The first tournament in 1948 was won by Dean Lind from a field of 495 entries. In 1999, the tournament set a record with 4,508 entries. Only two players have won the championship multiple times: Tiger Woods won the tournament for three consecutive years beginning in 1991; Jordan Spieth won in 2009 and 2011. In 2010, Jim Liu, at 14 years, 11 months, became the youngest champion ever, breaking Woods' mark of 15 years and 220 days.

The number of winners who have gone on to become PGA pros is considerable. Apart from Woods, well known winners include Johnny Miller (1964), David Duval (1989), Hunter Mahan (1999), Jordan Spieth (2009 and 2011), and Scottie Scheffler (2013).  Jack Nicklaus's best result was a semifinal loss.

The equivalent competition for girls is the U.S. Girls' Junior Championship.

Winners

Multiple winners
3 wins: Tiger Woods
2 wins: Jordan Spieth

Future sites

Chambers Bay is slated to host in 2033.
Bandon Dunes Golf Resort is slated to host in 2045.

Notes

External links
Official site - most of the information is in the archive section

Junior golf tournaments
Junior Amateur Golf Championship
Amateur golf tournaments in the United States